The name Cleveland Barons has been used by three professional hockey teams and one junior team.

Cleveland Barons (NHL), the National Hockey League team that played between 1976 and 1978
Cleveland Barons (1937–1973), the original American Hockey League (AHL) team
Cleveland Barons (2001–2006), the former San Jose Sharks AHL affiliate
Cleveland Jr. Barons, a former Junior A team in the NAHL that still retains a number of youth teams in the Cleveland area